Shri Aai Mata ji (Hindi Pronunciation: श्री आई माता जी; 1472 to 1561 in Vikram Samvat or 1415 to 1504 in Gregorian calendar) is believed to be an incarnation of the goddess, Ambe Maa (Jagdambe Maa).

History 
Jiji (जीजी) was the birth name of Shri Aai Mata Ji. She was born to Bikaji (Father) in the Ambapur village (now Ambaji, Gujarat).

Early life

Temple at Narlai, Rajasthan 
Shri Aai Mata Ji temple in Narlai is located at Aai mata road, Narlai, Rajasthan 306703, India

Temple at Daylana Kalan, Rajasthan

Temple at Bilara, Rajasthan 

Shri Aai Mata Ji temple in Bilara is located at Bader Rd, Bilara, Rajasthan 342602, India

References

15th-century Indian women
15th-century Indian people
Characters in Hindu mythology
15th-century Indian scholars
Indian women religious leaders
People from Pali district
Educators from Rajasthan
Women educators from Rajasthan
15th-century Hindu religious leaders
Scholars from Rajasthan